Michel Arrivé (7 December 1936 – 3 April 2017) was a French novelist, short story writer, linguist and academic. He was a Professor of Linguistics and Semiotics at Paris Nanterre University from 1983 to 2006. He authored several novels and short stories.

Early life
Michel Arrivé was born on 7 December 1936 in Neuilly-sur-Seine near Paris. His father was an engineer and his mother was a schoolteacher. His father was arrested in 1940, and Arrivé was raised by his extended family during the war.

Arrivé earned his Baccalauréat at 16. He passed Khâgne at the Lycée Louis-le-Grand and earned the agrégation at 21.

Career
Arrivé began his career as a high school teacher in Évreux and Pontoise. He subsequently became Frédéric Deloffre's assistant at the University of Paris. He taught linguistics at the University of Tours, until he became a Professor of Linguistics and Semiotics at Paris Nanterre University in 1983. He retired in 2006. During the course of his career, he published academic research about Alfred Jarry, Sigmund Freud, Jacques Lacan and Ferdinand de Saussure.

Arrivé was also a novelist and short story writer in 1977.

Personal life and death
Arrivé got married at 19 and had his first child at 20. He died on 3 April 2017 in Saint-Cloud near Paris.

Selected works

Linguistics

Short stories

Novels

References

1936 births
2017 deaths
People from Neuilly-sur-Seine
Linguists from France
Academic staff of the University of Paris
French male novelists
20th-century French novelists
20th-century French male writers
21st-century French novelists
21st-century French male writers